The Triple Crown Tournament was a cricket competition staged annually from 1993 to 2001 between the Home Nations; that is to say Ireland, Scotland, Wales and a team representing England. England were not represented by the professional English cricket team, but rather by an England Amateur XI in 1993 and 1994, by an England National Cricket Association XI in 1995 and 1996, and an England Cricket Board XI from 1997 onwards. 

Matches were one-day affairs, and were 55 overs a side in the first three tournaments, but 50 overs thereafter. Although internationals, they are considered minor matches, that is, games without the List A status granted to more important one-day competitions. The venue for the tournament rotated around the four competing nations, with England hosting the first competition. 

In the nine years of the competition, Scotland were by some way the most successful team, winning five titles compared with three for England, one for Ireland and none for Wales.

List of tournaments

1993 British Isles Championship 

The 1993 British Isles Championship is a cricket tournament that took place in 1993 in England. It was an initiative to help in the development of cricket in British Isles. The tournament was won by England NCA while Ireland came second. It was the first of 9 such tournaments held which was later replaced with European Cricket Championship

Teams
 NCA (England Amateur XI)

Group stage

Fixtures
  defeat  by 5 wickets
  NCA defeat  by 9 wickets
  defeat  NCA by 13 Runs
  defeat  by 6 Runs
  defeat  by 15 Runs
  NCA defeat

Result 
 National Cricket Academy won the tournament winning on Run Rate.  came second in the tournament

1994 British Isles Championship 

The 1994 British Isles Championship is a cricket tournament that took place in 1994 in Scotland. It was an initiative to help in the development of cricket in British Isles. The tournament was won by Scotland while England NCA came second. It was the second of 9 such tournaments held which was later replaced with European Cricket Championship

Teams
 NCA (England Amateur XI)

Group stage

Fixtures
  NCA defeat  by 9 wickets
  defeat 
  defeat  by 34 Runs
  NCA defeat 
  defeat  by 15 Runs
  defeat  NCA by losing fewer wickets (scores level)

Result 
 won the tournament winning on Run Rate.  National Cricket Academy came second in the tournament

1995 British Isles Championship 

The 1995 British Isles Championship is a cricket tournament that took place in 1995 in Northern Ireland. It was a continuation of the initiative to help in the development of cricket in British Isles. The tournament was won by Scotland while England NCA came second. It was the third of 9 such tournaments held which was later replaced with European Cricket Championship and Scotland won the second successive title

Teams
  NCA (England Amateur XI)

Group stage

Fixtures
  defeat  by 6 wickets
  defeat  NCA by 6 wickets
  defeat  in a Bowl-out
  NCA defeat  in a Bowl-out
  NCA defeat  by 1 Run
  defeat  by 6 Wickets

Result 
 won the tournament for the second time. It was a first time a team won on points and not Run Rate.  National Cricket Academy came second in the tournament

1996 British Isles Championship 

The 1996 British Isles Championship is a cricket tournament that took place in 1996 in Wales. It was a continuation of the initiative to help in the development of cricket in British Isles. The tournament was won by Ireland while England NCA came second. It was the fourth of 9 such tournaments held which was later replaced with European Cricket Championship. Ireland won the tournament for the first time and it was their first title in multi-nation cricket tournament.

Teams
  NCA (England Amateur XI)

Group stage

Fixtures
  defeat  by 5 wickets
  NCA defeat  by 9 wickets
  defeat  by 7 wickets
  NCA defeat  by 16 runs
  defeat  NCA by 7 wickets
  defeat  by 4 Wickets

Result 
 won the tournament for the first time. They won on points and Net Run Rate.  National Cricket Academy came second in the tournament for a third time in a row

1997 British Isles Championship 

The 1997 British Isles Championship is a cricket tournament that took place in 1997 in England. This was the fifth tournament initiated to help in the development of cricket in British Isles. The tournament was won by Scotland while England Cricket Board XI came second. This tournament was later replaced with European Cricket Championship. This was the first appearance for England CB XI who replaced England NCA for future tournaments

Teams
 Cricket Board XI

Group stage

Fixtures
  CB XI 351-5 defeat  130-10 by 221 Runs
  218-6 defeat  199-10 by 19 Runs
  CB XI 209-10 defeat  190-10 by 19 Runs
  246-6 defeat  245-5 by 1 Run
  defeat  CB XI in a Bowl-Out 3-2

Result 
  won the tournament winning for a record third time.  CB XI came second in the tournament.

1998 British Isles Championship 

The 1998 British Isles Championship is a cricket tournament that took place in 1998 in Scotland. It was second time Scotland hosted this initiative to help in the development of cricket in British Isles. The tournament was won by England CB XI while Scotland came second. It was the first win for ECB XI who had replaced England NCA in the last tournament. This tournament was replaced after 2001 with the European Cricket Championship.

Teams
 CB XI

Group stage

Fixtures
  160-9 defeat  151-10 by 9 Runs
  CB XI 271-5 defeat  127-10 by 144 Runs
  164-9 lost to  167-7 by 3 Wickets
  171-9 defeat  CB XI 167-9 by 4 Runs
  CB XI 204-8 defeat  202-8 by 2 Runs
  224-6 defeat  207-10 by 17 Runs

Result 
 CB XI won the tournament winning on Run Rate for the first time.  came second in the tournament

1999 British Isles Championship 

The 1999 British Isles Championship is a cricket tournament that took place in 1999 in Ireland. It was a continuation of the initiative to help in the development of cricket in British Isles and first time hosted by Ireland. Ireland who have a combined team for North and South Ireland, last time hosted the tournament in Belfast, Northern Ireland. The tournament was won by Scotland while England CB XI came second. The tournaments which was later replaced with European Cricket Championship was won by Scotland for a record fourth time. It was the first time in this tournament that Wales did not finish at the bottom.

Teams
  CB XI

Group stage

Fixtures
  234-8 defeat  231-8 by 2 Wickets
  CB XI 236-10 defeat  142-10 by 94 Runs
  179-9 defeat  CB XI 171-8 by 8 Runs
  154-2 defeat  153-10 by 8 wickets
  151-4 defeat  149-10 by 6 Wickets
  CB XI 173-8 defeat  136 by 37 Runs

Result 
 won the tournament for a record fourth time.  CB XI came second in the tournament. It was a first time  did not finish last but came third.

2000 British Isles Championship 

The 2000 British Isles Championship is a cricket tournament that took place in 2000 in Wales. It was second time hosted by Wales as a continuation of the initiative to help in the development of cricket in British Isles. The tournament was won by Scotland while Ireland came second. The tournament which was later replaced with European Cricket Championship was won by Scotland for a record fifth time. It was the worst performance for a team representing  who finished at the bottom without winning any matches. It was also the first time that tournament had 2 tied matches based on bowl-out. Also this tournament had just 1 complete match, 1 partial match and rest 4 were decided in a bowl-out. A bowl-out happened in case the match was washed out.

Teams
  CB XI

Group stage

Fixtures
  defeat  CB XI on Run Rate
  defeat  in a bowl out
  defeat  by 157 Runs
  defeat  in a bowl out

Result 
 won the tournament for record fifth time.  came second in the tournament.  CB XI produced the worst performance for a team representing England though their all 3 matches were rain affected.

2001 British Isles Championship 

The 2001 British Isles Championship is a cricket tournament that took place in 2001 in England. This was the last of the nine tournaments initiated to help in the development of cricket in British Isles. This tournament was later replaced with European Cricket Championship. The tournament marked the comeback of England Cricket Board XI who won it after the previous tournament when they came last. Scotland came second.  The busy schedule for Scotland and Ireland who now were ICC members meant that having future tournaments was not possible. ECB initiated the process where these teams could play in the county championship besides the ICC-Europe tournaments.

Teams
 Cricket Board XI

Group stage

Fixtures
  CB XI beat  by 32 runs
14 August, Arundel Castle 
ECB XI 214-10 (P Bryson 66, S Chapman 56, R Howitt 54, P Hoffmann 5-34)
Scotland 182-10 (C Smith 42, B Patterson 39, I Parkin 3-60)
  beat  by 2 wickets
14 August, Horsham 
Ireland 149-10 (A Patterson 39, P Jenkins 3-24, K Bell 3-29) 
Wales 150-8 (A Jones 45)
  beat  by 6 wickets
15 August 
Wales 120-10 (S Morris 28, P Hoffmann 2-15, G Maiden 2-24, C Wright 2-26) 
Scotland 121-4 (C Smith 35, C Wright 21*)
  CB XI beat  by 6 wickets
15 August, Stirlands 
Ireland 109-10 (D Joyce 43, C Batt 3-14, M Sharp 3-15) 
ECB XI 111-4
  beat  by 3 wickets
16 August, East Grinstead 
Ireland 211 (P Davy 53, A Patterson 36, C Wright 3-35) 
Scotland 214-7 (G Maiden 79*, C Wright 45*, A McCoubrey 3-17, J McGonigle 3-22)
  CB XI beat  by 102 runs
16 August, Brighton 
ECB XI 213-6 (C Amos 65, P Bryson 50, S Foster 38) 
Wales 111-10 (M Sharp 3-15, S Chapman 3-18, I Parkin 3-19)

Result 
 CB XI  won the tournament winning for second time making a comeback from the disastrous last tournament where they were win less.  came second in the tournament.

Winners

References

 
International cricket competitions